Groener v Minister for Education (1989) Case 379/87 is an EU law case, concerning the free movement of workers in the European Union.

Facts
A Dutch woman, Miss Anita Groener, was refused a permanent teaching post at a Dublin design college. She did not speak Irish. She argued this was a restriction on her right to free movement of workers under TFEU article 45.

Judgment
The Court of Justice held that the language requirement was justifiable.

See also

European Union law

References

Court of Justice of the European Union case law
Freedom of movement
Irish labour law
Language case law
1989 in case law